Custom Built for Capitalism is an EP by Foetus Over Frisco, released in April 1982 by Self Immolation.

Track listing

Personnel
Adapted from the Custom Built for Capitalism liner notes.
 J. G. Thirlwell (as Foetus Over Frisco) – vocals, instruments, production

Release history

References

External links 
 Custom Built for Capitalism at foetus.org

1982 debut EPs
Foetus (band) albums
Albums produced by JG Thirlwell